The final of the Men's discus throw event at the 2002 European Championships in Munich, Germany was held on August 11, 2002. There were a total number of 28 participating athletes. The qualifying rounds were staged two days earlier, on August 9, with the mark set in 63.00 metres (3 + 9 athletes).

Medalists

Abbreviations
All results shown are in metres

Records

Qualification

Group A

Group B

Final

See also
 2000 Men's Olympic Discus Throw (Sydney)
 2001 Men's World Championships Discus Throw (Edmonton)
 2003 Men's World Championships Discus Throw (Paris)
 2004 Men's Olympic Discus Throw (Athens)

References
 Results
 todor66
 athletix
 throwing

Discus throw
Discus throw at the European Athletics Championships